Petrova Fossil is a character in the book Ballet Shoes by Noel Streatfeild, and in two films based on that book.

Petrova's story 

Petrova, the middle Fossil sister, was adopted by Gum (Great Uncle Matthew) from a Russian couple who died in hospital shortly after her birth. His great-niece Sylvia named the baby after Saint Peter in a Russian format, as her sister was named after another apostle and Sylvia felt the baby should have a Russian name. Petrova was a hardworking, honest and caring tomboy who was interested only in engines, airplanes and cars. Unlike the other Fossil sisters who were interested in the arts, she dreamed of becoming a mechanic or pilot. In the novel, Petrova was described as a technically proficient dancer and singer and was perfectly able to land roles in her auditions, but she had little real affinity for the arts. She played Mytyl in a charity production of Maeterlinck's The Blue Bird and Mustard-Seed in A Midsummer Night's Dream, both alongside her sister Pauline.  She was also a page in Richard III and was in a dance troupe of jumping beans in a pantomime production in the London suburbs.

At the end of Ballet Shoes she was going to live with Gum and follow her dreams of being a pilot. The subsequent novels Theater Shoes and Movie Shoes mentioned that Petrova had nothing to do with the arts again. In her short story What Happened to Pauline, Petrova, and Posy, Streatfeild said that she was sure that Pauline would never make it into the history books as film stars never do, and Posy would be part of ballet history but nothing more - yet she often wonders whether Petrova might have been the one to put the name Fossil in history books.

Portrayed by 

 Yasmin Paige in the 2007 film
 Jane Slaughter in the 1975 serial

External links 
Petrova is a popular character in fan fiction stories on AO3. She is often portrayed as a pilot in the Air Transport Auxiliary and as a garage owner.

Fossil, Petrova
Fictional adoptees
Fictional aviators